"These Things" is a song by American rock band She Wants Revenge. It was released as their debut single and the lead single from their self-titled debut studio album on October 25, 2005. On Billboard's Alternative Songs chart, "These Things" peaked at number 22.

Music videos
The band has produced two music videos for "These Things". One video splices screencaps of various beautiful, young women in seductive, orgasmic poses with snippets of Adam playing the piano and Justin singing. Another video features Shirley Manson, lead singer of the band Garbage, and starts off with Adam and Justin walking down a city street at night. Without warning, a third man attacks Justin as he walks past the two of them but Adam fends him off. A female bystander, played by Manson, comforts Justin and helps him to his feet, and she and Adam walk him to a car. The video ends with Justin's attacker washing his hands in a bathroom and looking up as he notices Manson standing behind him.

Track listing
"These Things [Radio Edit]" – 3:17
"Tear You Apart" – 4:45
"Spend the Night" – 4:22
"Black Liner Run" – 4:52

Charts

References

2005 debut singles
She Wants Revenge songs
Music videos directed by Sophie Muller
2005 songs
Songs written by Adam Bravin